The  is a freight only railway company in Ōgaki, Gifu, Japan. The company was founded in 1927. Its line mainly transports limestone. The company was reported as being dissolved in 2013.

History
The 3km line from Mino-Akasaka to Ichihashi opened in 1928, and a passenger service operated from 1930 to 1945.

Lines
Ichihashi Line (市橋線)
 — Otomezaka: 1.3 km / 0.8 mi.

3 freight trains every day on the Ichihashi Line (市橋線). Hirui Line no longer in service.

Ichihashi Line (市橋線)
Otomezaka — Ichihashi: 1.3 km / 0.8 mi.
Hirui Line (昼飯線)
Mino-Akasaka — Hirui: 1.9 km / 1.2 mi.

See also
List of railway companies in Japan

References
This article incorporates material from the corresponding article in the Japanese Wikipedia

External links 
 Kinshōzan Line Club, unofficial fansite 
 Seinō Railway, unofficial fansite 

Railway companies of Japan
Rail transport in Gifu Prefecture